Cora terricoleslia is a species of basidiolichen in the family Hygrophoraceae. Found in Bolivia, it was formally described as a new species in 2016 by Karina Wilk, Manuela Dal Forno, and Robert Lücking. The specific epithet terricoleslia combines a reference to the lichen's terricolous growth and also honours mycologist David Leslie Hawksworth. This is the highest altitude recorded for a species of Cora. At this location, the lichen grows on the ground with mosses and other vegetation of the puna grassland.

References

terricoleslia
Lichen species
Lichens described in 2016
Lichens of Bolivia
Taxa named by Robert Lücking
Basidiolichens